Moon Joon-young is a South Korean singer, actor, and model. He debuted as member of boy group ZE:A. He also appeared in dramas Poseidon, Vampire Idol and The Clinic for Married Couples: Love and War. He also appeared in films such as Ronin Pop and ZE:A Breathe.

Biography and career
He was born in Seoul on February 9, 1989. He attended Digital Seoul Culture Arts University after he graduated. In 2010 he signed contract with Star Empire Entertainment. He debuted as member of boy group ZE:A in 2010. Apart from his group activities, he also made his debut as an actor and appeared in various television dramas Poseidon, Please Marry Me, Gloria, Vampire Idol and Poseidon, The Clinic for Married Couples: Love and War. He also appeared in films Ronin Pop and ZE:A Breathe. In 2017 his contract with Star Entertainment got expired. He signed with EXA Entertainment in 2017 and to focus on his acting.

Filmography

Television series

Film

References

External links
 

1989 births
Living people
21st-century South Korean male actors
South Korean male models
South Korean male television actors
South Korean male film actors
South Korean male idols
South Korean male singers
South Korean pop singers